

Peerage of England, Scotland and Great Britain

Dukes

|colspan=5 style="background: #fcc" align="center"|Peerage of England
|-
|Duke of Cornwall (1337)||Frederick, Prince of Wales||1727||1751||
|-
|rowspan=2|Duke of Norfolk (1483)||Thomas Howard, 8th Duke of Norfolk||1701||1732||Died
|-
|Edward Howard, 9th Duke of Norfolk||1732||1777||
|-
|Duke of Somerset (1547)||Charles Seymour, 6th Duke of Somerset||1678||1748||
|-
|rowspan=2|Duke of Cleveland (1670)||Charles FitzRoy, 2nd Duke of Cleveland||1709||1730||Died
|-
|William FitzRoy, 3rd Duke of Cleveland||1730||1774||
|-
|Duke of Portsmouth (1673)||Louise de Kérouaille, Duchess of Portsmouth||1673||1734||Died, title extinct
|-
|Duke of Richmond (1675)||Charles Lennox, 2nd Duke of Richmond||1723||1750||
|-
|Duke of Grafton (1675)||Charles FitzRoy, 2nd Duke of Grafton||1690||1757||
|-
|Duke of Beaufort (1682)||Henry Scudamore, 3rd Duke of Beaufort||1714||1745||
|-
|Duke of St Albans (1684)||Charles Beauclerk, 2nd Duke of St Albans||1726||1751||
|-
|Duke of Bolton (1689)||Charles Powlett, 3rd Duke of Bolton||1722||1754||
|-
|rowspan=2|Duke of Leeds (1694)||Peregrine Osborne, 3rd Duke of Leeds||1729||1731||Died
|-
|Thomas Osborne, 4th Duke of Leeds||1731||1789||
|-
|rowspan=2|Duke of Bedford (1694)||Wriothesley Russell, 3rd Duke of Bedford||1711||1732||Died
|-
|John Russell, 4th Duke of Bedford||1732||1771||
|-
|Duke of Devonshire (1694)||William Cavendish, 3rd Duke of Devonshire||1729||1755||
|-
|rowspan=2|Duke of Marlborough (1702)||Henrietta Godolphin, 2nd Duchess of Marlborough||1722||1733||Died
|-
|Charles Spencer, 3rd Duke of Marlborough||1733||1758||
|-
|Duke of Buckingham and Normanby (1703)||Edmund Sheffield, 2nd Duke of Buckingham and Normanby||1721||1735||Died, title extinct
|-
|Duke of Rutland (1703)||John Manners, 3rd Duke of Rutland||1721||1779||
|-
|Duke of Montagu (1705)||John Montagu, 2nd Duke of Montagu||1709||1749||
|-
|colspan=5 style="background: #fcc" align="center"|Peerage of Scotland
|-
|Duke of Hamilton (1643)||James Hamilton, 5th Duke of Hamilton||1712||1743||
|-
|rowspan=2|Duke of Buccleuch (1663)||Anne Scott, 1st Duchess of Buccleuch||1663||1732||Died
|-
|Francis Scott, 2nd Duke of Buccleuch||1732||1751||
|-
|Duke of Queensberry (1684)||Charles Douglas, 3rd Duke of Queensberry||1711||1778||
|-
|Duke of Gordon (1684)||Cosmo Gordon, 3rd Duke of Gordon||1728||1752||
|-
|Duke of Argyll (1701)||John Campbell, 2nd Duke of Argyll||1703||1743||
|-
|Duke of Atholl (1703)||James Murray, 2nd Duke of Atholl||1724||1764||
|-
|Duke of Douglas (1703)||Archibald Douglas, 1st Duke of Douglas||1703||1761||
|-
|Duke of Montrose (1707)||James Graham, 1st Duke of Montrose||1707||1742||
|-
|Duke of Roxburghe (1707)||John Ker, 1st Duke of Roxburghe||1707||1741||
|-
|colspan=5 style="background: #fcc" align="center"|Peerage of Great Britain
|-
|Duke of Kent (1710)||Henry Grey, 1st Duke of Kent||1710||1740||
|-
|Duke of Ancaster and Kesteven (1715)||Peregrine Bertie, 2nd Duke of Ancaster and Kesteven||1723||1742||
|-
|Duke of Kingston-upon-Hull (1715)||Evelyn Pierrepont, 2nd Duke of Kingston-upon-Hull||1726||1773||
|-
|Duke of Newcastle upon Tyne (1715)||Thomas Pelham-Holles, 1st Duke of Newcastle||1715||1768||
|-
|Duke of Portland (1716)||William Bentinck, 2nd Duke of Portland||1726||1762||
|-
|Duchess of Kendal (1719)||Melusine von der Schulenburg, Duchess of Kendal||1719||1743||
|-
|rowspan=2|Duke of Manchester (1719)||William Montagu, 2nd Duke of Manchester||1722||1739||Died
|-
|Robert Montagu, 3rd Duke of Manchester||1739||1762||
|-
|Duke of Chandos (1719)||James Brydges, 1st Duke of Chandos||1719||1744||
|-
|Duke of Dorset (1720)||Lionel Sackville, 1st Duke of Dorset||1720||1765||
|-
|Duke of Bridgewater (1720)||Scroop Egerton, 1st Duke of Bridgewater||1720||1745||
|-
|Duke of Cumberland (1726)||Prince William, Duke of Cumberland||1726||1765||
|-
|}

Marquesses

|colspan=5 style="background: #fcc" align="center"|Peerage of England
|-
|Marquess of Powis (1687)||William Herbert, 2nd Marquess of Powis||1696||1745||
|-
|colspan=5 style="background: #fcc" align="center"|Peerage of Scotland
|-
|Marquess of Tweeddale (1694)||John Hay, 4th Marquess of Tweeddale||1715||1762||
|-
|Marquess of Lothian (1701)||William Kerr, 3rd Marquess of Lothian||1722||1767||
|-
|rowspan=2|Marquess of Annandale (1701)||James Johnstone, 2nd Marquess of Annandale||1721||1730||Died
|-
|George Vanden-Bempde, 3rd Marquess of Annandale||1730||1792||
|-
|colspan=5 style="background: #fcc" align="center"|Peerage of Great Britain
|-
|colspan=5 align="center"|-
|-
|}

Earls

|colspan=5 style="background: #fcc" align="center"|Peerage of England
|-
|Earl of Shrewsbury (1442)||Gilbert Talbot, 13th Earl of Shrewsbury||1718||1743||
|-
|rowspan=2|Earl of Derby (1485)||James Stanley, 10th Earl of Derby||1702||1736||Died
|-
|Edward Stanley, 11th Earl of Derby||1736||1776||
|-
|Earl of Huntingdon (1529)||Theophilus Hastings, 9th Earl of Huntingdon||1705||1746||
|-
|rowspan=2|Earl of Pembroke (1551)||Thomas Herbert, 8th Earl of Pembroke||1683||1733||Died
|-
|Henry Herbert, 9th Earl of Pembroke||1733||1749||
|-
|rowspan=2|Earl of Devon (1553)||William Courtenay, de jure 6th Earl of Devon||1702||1735||Died
|-
|William Courtenay, de jure 7th Earl of Devon||1735||1762||
|-
|rowspan=2|Earl of Lincoln (1572)||George Clinton, 8th Earl of Lincoln||1728||1730||Died
|-
|Henry Clinton, 9th Earl of Lincoln||1730||1794||
|-
|rowspan=3|Earl of Suffolk (1603)||Edward Howard, 8th Earl of Suffolk||1722||1731||Died
|-
|Charles Howard, 9th Earl of Suffolk||1731||1733||Died
|-
|Henry Howard, 10th Earl of Suffolk||1733||1745||
|-
|Earl of Exeter (1605)||Brownlow Cecil, 8th Earl of Exeter||1722||1754||
|-
|Earl of Salisbury (1605)||James Cecil, 6th Earl of Salisbury||1728||1780||
|-
|Earl of Northampton (1618)||James Compton, 5th Earl of Northampton||1727||1754||
|-
|rowspan=2|Earl of Leicester (1618)||John Sidney, 6th Earl of Leicester||1705||1737||Died
|-
|Jocelyn Sidney, 7th Earl of Leicester||1737||1743||
|-
|Earl of Warwick (1618)||Edward Rich, 8th Earl of Warwick||1721||1759||
|-
|Earl of Denbigh (1622)||William Feilding, 5th Earl of Denbigh||1717||1755||
|-
|rowspan=2|Earl of Westmorland (1624)||Thomas Fane, 6th Earl of Westmorland||1699||1736||Died
|-
|John Fane, 7th Earl of Westmorland||1736||1762||
|-
|Earl of Berkshire (1626)||Henry Howard, 4th Earl of Berkshire||1706||1757||
|-
|Earl Rivers (1626)||John Savage, 5th Earl Rivers||1712||1737||Died, title extinct
|-
|rowspan="2"|Earl of Peterborough (1628)||Charles Mordaunt, 3rd Earl of Peterborough||1697||1735||Died
|-
|Charles Mordaunt, 4th Earl of Peterborough||1735||1779||
|-
|rowspan="2"|Earl of Stamford (1628)||Harry Grey, 3rd Earl of Stamford||1720||1739||Died
|-
|Harry Grey, 4th Earl of Stamford||1739||1768||
|-
|rowspan="2"|Earl of Winchilsea (1628)||Daniel Finch, 7th Earl of Winchilsea||1729||1730||Died
|-
|Daniel Finch, 8th Earl of Winchilsea||1730||1769||
|-
|Earl of Chesterfield (1628)||Philip Stanhope, 4th Earl of Chesterfield||1726||1773||
|-
|Earl of Thanet (1628)||Sackville Tufton, 7th Earl of Thanet||1729||1753||
|-
|Earl of Sunderland (1643)||Charles Spencer, 5th Earl of Sunderland||1729||1758||Succeeded to the Dukedom of Marlborough, see above
|-
|Earl of Scarsdale (1645)||Nicholas Leke, 4th Earl of Scarsdale||1707||1736||Died, title extinct
|-
|Earl of Sandwich (1660)||John Montagu, 4th Earl of Sandwich||1729||1792||
|-
|rowspan="2"|Earl of Anglesey (1661)||Arthur Annesley, 5th Earl of Anglesey||1710||1737||Died
|-
|Richard Annesley, 6th Earl of Anglesey||1737||1761||
|-
|rowspan="2"|Earl of Cardigan (1661)||George Brudenell, 3rd Earl of Cardigan||1703||1732||Died
|-
|George Brudenell, 4th Earl of Cardigan||1732||1790||
|-
|Earl of Clarendon (1661)||Henry Hyde, 4th Earl of Clarendon||1723||1753||
|-
|Earl of Essex (1661)||William Capell, 3rd Earl of Essex||1710||1743||
|-
|rowspan="2"|Earl of Carlisle (1661)||Charles Howard, 3rd Earl of Carlisle||1692||1738||Died
|-
|Henry Howard, 4th Earl of Carlisle||1738||1758||
|-
|Earl of Ailesbury (1664)||Thomas Bruce, 2nd Earl of Ailesbury||1685||1741||
|-
|Earl of Burlington (1664)||Richard Boyle, 3rd Earl of Burlington||1704||1753||Earl of Cork in the Peerage of Ireland
|-
|Earl of Shaftesbury (1672)||Anthony Ashley Cooper, 4th Earl of Shaftesbury||1713||1771||
|-
|Earl of Lichfield (1674)||George Lee, 2nd Earl of Lichfield||1716||1742||
|-
|Earl of Radnor (1679)||Henry Robartes, 3rd Earl of Radnor||1723||1741||
|-
|Earl of Yarmouth (1679)||William Paston, 2nd Earl of Yarmouth||1683||1732||Died, title extinct
|-
|rowspan="2"|Earl of Berkeley (1679)||James Berkeley, 3rd Earl of Berkeley||1710||1736||Died
|-
|Augustus Berkeley, 4th Earl of Berkeley||1736||1755||
|-
|Earl of Abingdon (1682)||Montagu Venables-Bertie, 2nd Earl of Abingdon||1699||1743||
|-
|Earl of Gainsborough (1682)||Baptist Noel, 4th Earl of Gainsborough||1714||1751||
|-
|rowspan="2"|Earl of Plymouth (1682)||Other Windsor, 3rd Earl of Plymouth||1727||1732||Died
|-
|Other Windsor, 4th Earl of Plymouth||1732||1771||
|-
|Earl of Holderness (1682)||Robert Darcy, 4th Earl of Holderness||1722||1778||
|-
|rowspan="2"|Earl of Stafford (1688)||William Stafford-Howard, 2nd Earl of Stafford||1719||1734||Died
|-
|William Stafford-Howard, 3rd Earl of Stafford||1734||1751||
|-
|Earl of Warrington (1690)||George Booth, 2nd Earl of Warrington||1694||1758||
|-
|rowspan="2"|Earl of Scarbrough (1690)||Richard Lumley, 2nd Earl of Scarbrough||1721||1739||Died
|-
|Thomas Lumley-Saunderson, 3rd Earl of Scarbrough||1739||1752||
|-
|rowspan="2"|Earl of Bradford (1694)||Henry Newport, 3rd Earl of Bradford||1723||1734||Died
|-
|Thomas Newport, 4th Earl of Bradford||1734||1762||
|-
|rowspan="2"|Earl of Rochford (1695)||Frederick Nassau de Zuylestein, 3rd Earl of Rochford||1710||1738||Died
|-
|William Nassau de Zuylestein, 4th Earl of Rochford||1738||1781||
|-
|Earl of Albemarle (1697)||Willem van Keppel, 2nd Earl of Albemarle||1718||1754||
|-
|Earl of Coventry (1697)||William Coventry, 5th Earl of Coventry||1719||1751||
|-
|Earl of Jersey (1697)||William Villiers, 3rd Earl of Jersey||1721||1769||
|-
|Earl of Grantham (1698)||Henry de Nassau d'Auverquerque, 1st Earl of Grantham||1698||1754||
|-
|Earl Poulett (1706)||John Poulett, 1st Earl Poulett||1706||1743||
|-
|Earl of Godolphin (1706)||Francis Godolphin, 2nd Earl of Godolphin||1712||1766||
|-
|rowspan="2"|Earl of Cholmondeley (1706)||George Cholmondeley, 2nd Earl of Cholmondeley||1725||1733||Died
|-
|George Cholmondeley, 3rd Earl of Cholmondeley||1733||1770||
|-
|colspan=5 style="background: #fcc" align="center"|Peerage of Scotland
|-
|Earl of Crawford (1398)||John Lindsay, 20th Earl of Crawford||1713||1749||
|-
|Earl of Erroll (1452)||Mary Hay, 14th Countess of Erroll||1717||1758||
|-
|rowspan=2|Earl of Sutherland (1235)||John Gordon, 16th Earl of Sutherland||1703||1733||Died
|-
|William Sutherland, 17th Earl of Sutherland||1733||1750||
|-
|Earl of Rothes (1458)||John Leslie, 10th Earl of Rothes||1722||1767||
|-
|rowspan=3|Earl of Morton (1458)||Robert Douglas, 12th Earl of Morton||1715||1730||Died
|-
|George Douglas, 13th Earl of Morton||1730||1738||Died
|-
|James Douglas, 14th Earl of Morton||1738||1768||
|-
|rowspan=2|Earl of Glencairn (1488)||William Cunningham, 12th Earl of Glencairn||1703||1734||Died
|-
|William Cunningham, 13th Earl of Glencairn||1734||1775||
|-
|Earl of Eglinton (1507)||Alexander Montgomerie, 10th Earl of Eglinton||1729||1769||
|-
|Earl of Cassilis (1509)||John Kennedy, 8th Earl of Cassilis||1701||1759||
|-
|Earl of Caithness (1455)||Alexander Sinclair, 9th Earl of Caithness||1705||1765||
|-
|Earl of Buchan (1469)||David Erskine, 9th Earl of Buchan||1695||1745||
|-
|rowspan=3|Earl of Moray (1562)||Charles Stuart, 6th Earl of Moray||1701||1735||Died
|-
|Francis Stuart, 7th Earl of Moray||1735||1739||Died
|-
|James Stuart, 8th Earl of Moray||1739||1767||
|-
|Earl of Home (1605)||William Home, 8th Earl of Home||1720||1761||
|-
|Earl of Wigtown (1606)||John Fleming, 6th Earl of Wigtown||1681||1744||
|-
|rowspan=2|Earl of Abercorn (1606)||James Hamilton, 6th Earl of Abercorn||1701||1734||Died
|-
|James Hamilton, 7th Earl of Abercorn||1734||1744||
|-
|rowspan=2|Earl of Strathmore and Kinghorne (1606)||James Lyon, 7th Earl of Strathmore and Kinghorne||1728||1735||Died
|-
|Thomas Lyon, 8th Earl of Strathmore and Kinghorne||1735||1753||
|-
|Earl of Kellie (1619)||Alexander Erskine, 5th Earl of Kellie||1710||1758||
|-
|rowspan=2|Earl of Haddington (1619)||Thomas Hamilton, 6th Earl of Haddington||1685||1735||Died
|-
|Thomas Hamilton, 7th Earl of Haddington||1735||1794||
|-
|Earl of Galloway (1623)||James Stewart, 5th Earl of Galloway||1694||1746||
|-
|Earl of Lauderdale (1624)||Charles Maitland, 6th Earl of Lauderdale||1710||1744||
|-
|rowspan=2|Earl of Loudoun (1633)||Hugh Campbell, 3rd Earl of Loudoun||1684||1731||Died
|-
|John Campbell, 4th Earl of Loudoun||1731||1782||
|-
|Earl of Kinnoull (1633)||George Hay, 8th Earl of Kinnoull||1709||1758||
|-
|Earl of Dumfries (1633)||Penelope Crichton, 4th Countess of Dumfries||1694||1742||
|-
|Earl of Stirling (1633)||Henry Alexander, 5th Earl of Stirling||1691||1739||Died; Peerage dormant
|-
|Earl of Traquair (1633)||Charles Stewart, 4th Earl of Traquair||1673||1741||
|-
|Earl of Wemyss (1633)||James Wemyss, 5th Earl of Wemyss||1720||1756||
|-
|rowspan=2|Earl of Dalhousie (1633)||William Ramsay, 6th Earl of Dalhousie||1710||1739||Died
|-
|Charles Ramsay, 7th Earl of Dalhousie||1739||1764||
|-
|rowspan=2|Earl of Findlater (1638)||James Ogilvy, 4th Earl of Findlater||1711||1730||Died
|-
|James Ogilvy, 5th Earl of Findlater||1730||1764||
|-
|Earl of Leven (1641)||Alexander Leslie, 5th Earl of Leven||1728||1754||
|-
|Earl of Dysart (1643)||Lionel Tollemache, 4th Earl of Dysart||1727||1770||
|-
|rowspan=2|Earl of Selkirk (1646)||Charles Douglas, 2nd Earl of Selkirk||1694||1739||Died
|-
|John Hamilton, 3rd Earl of Selkirk||1739||1744||
|-
|Earl of Northesk (1647)||David Carnegie, 5th Earl of Northesk||1729||1741||
|-
|Earl of Kincardine (1647)||Thomas Bruce, 7th Earl of Kincardine||1721||1740||
|-
|rowspan=2|Earl of Balcarres (1651)||Alexander Lindsay, 4th Earl of Balcarres||1722||1736||Died
|-
|James Lindsay, 5th Earl of Balcarres||1736||1768||
|-
|rowspan=2|Earl of Aboyne (1660)||John Gordon, 3rd Earl of Aboyne||1702||1732||Died
|-
|Charles Gordon, 4th Earl of Aboyne||1732||1794||
|-
|Earl of Newburgh (1660)||Charles Livingston, 2nd Earl of Newburgh||1670||1755||
|-
|Earl of Kilmarnock (1661)||William Boyd, 4th Earl of Kilmarnock||1717||1746||
|-
|rowspan=2|Earl of Dundonald (1669)||Thomas Cochrane, 6th Earl of Dundonald||1725||1737||Died
|-
|William Cochrane, 7th Earl of Dundonald||1737||1758||
|-
|Earl of Dumbarton (1675)||George Douglas, 2nd Earl of Dumbarton||1692||1749||
|-
|Earl of Kintore (1677)||John Keith, 3rd Earl of Kintore||1718||1758||
|-
|Earl of Breadalbane and Holland (1677)||John Campbell, 2nd Earl of Breadalbane and Holland||1717||1752||
|-
|Earl of Aberdeen (1682)||William Gordon, 2nd Earl of Aberdeen||1720||1746||
|-
|Earl of Dunmore (1686)||John Murray, 2nd Earl of Dunmore||1710||1752||
|-
|rowspan=2|Earl of Orkney (1696)||George Hamilton, 1st Earl of Orkney||1696||1737||Died
|-
|Anne O'Brien, 2nd Countess of Orkney||1737||1756||
|-
|Earl of Ruglen (1697)||John Hamilton, 1st Earl of Ruglen||1697||1744||Succeeded to the Earldom of Selkirk
|-
|rowspan=2|Earl of March (1697)||William Douglas, 2nd Earl of March||1705||1731||Died
|-
|William Douglas, 3rd Earl of March||1731||1810||
|-
|Earl of Marchmont (1697)||Alexander Hume-Campbell, 2nd Earl of Marchmont||1724||1740||
|-
|rowspan=2|Earl of Hyndford (1701)||James Carmichael, 2nd Earl of Hyndford||1710||1737||Died
|-
|John Carmichael, 3rd Earl of Hyndford||1737||1766||
|-
|rowspan=2|Earl of Cromartie (1703)||John Mackenzie, 2nd Earl of Cromartie||1714||1731||Died
|-
|George Mackenzie, 3rd Earl of Cromartie||1731||1746||
|-
|Earl of Stair (1703)||John Dalrymple, 2nd Earl of Stair||1707||1747||
|-
|Earl of Rosebery (1703)||James Primrose, 2nd Earl of Rosebery||1723||1765||
|-
|rowspan=2|Earl of Glasgow (1703)||David Boyle, 1st Earl of Glasgow||1703||1733||Died
|-
|John Boyle, 2nd Earl of Glasgow||1733||1740||
|-
|rowspan=2|Earl of Portmore (1703)||David Colyear, 1st Earl of Portmore||1703||1730||Died
|-
|Charles Colyear, 2nd Earl of Portmore||1730||1785||
|-
|Earl of Bute (1703)||John Stuart, 3rd Earl of Bute||1723||1792||
|-
|Earl of Hopetoun (1703)||Charles Hope, 1st Earl of Hopetoun||1703||1742||
|-
|rowspan=3|Earl of Deloraine (1706)||Henry Scott, 1st Earl of Deloraine||1706||1730||Died
|-
|Francis Scott, 2nd Earl of Deloraine||1730||1739||Died
|-
|Henry Scott, 3rd Earl of Deloraine||1739||1740||
|-
|Earl of Ilay (1706)||Archibald Campbell, 1st Earl of Ilay||1706||1761||
|-
|colspan=5 style="background: #fcc" align="center"|Peerage of Great Britain
|-
|Earl of Oxford and Mortimer (1711)||Edward Harley, 2nd Earl of Oxford and Earl Mortimer||1724||1741||
|-
|rowspan=2|Earl of Strafford (1711)||Thomas Wentworth, 1st Earl of Strafford||1711||1739||Died
|-
|William Wentworth, 2nd Earl of Strafford||1739||1791||
|-
|Earl Ferrers (1711)||Henry Shirley, 3rd Earl Ferrers||1729||1745||
|-
|Earl of Dartmouth (1711)||William Legge, 1st Earl of Dartmouth||1711||1750||
|-
|Earl of Tankerville (1714)||Charles Bennet, 2nd Earl of Tankerville||1722||1753||
|-
|Earl of Aylesford (1714)||Heneage Finch, 2nd Earl of Aylesford||1740||1757||
|-
|Earl of Bristol (1714)||John Hervey, 1st Earl of Bristol||1714||1751||
|-
|Earl of Rockingham (1714)||Lewis Watson, 2nd Earl of Rockingham||1724||1745||
|-
|Earl of Uxbridge (1714)||Henry Paget, 1st Earl of Uxbridge||1714||1743||
|-
|Earl Granville (1715)||Grace Carteret, 1st Countess Granville||1715||1744||
|-
|rowspan=2|Earl of Halifax (1715)||George Montagu, 1st Earl of Halifax||1715||1739||Died
|-
|George Montagu-Dunk, 2nd Earl of Halifax||1739||1771||
|-
|rowspan=2|Earl of Sussex (1717)||Talbot Yelverton, 1st Earl of Sussex||1717||1731||Died
|-
|George Yelverton, 2nd Earl of Sussex||1731||1758||
|-
||Earl Cowper (1718)||William Clavering-Cowper, 2nd Earl Cowper||1723||1764||
|-
|Earl Stanhope (1718)||Philip Stanhope, 2nd Earl Stanhope||1721||1786||
|-
|Earl Coningsby (1719)||Margaret Newton, 2nd Countess Coningsby||1729||1761||
|-
|rowspan=2|Earl of Harborough (1719)||Bennet Sherard, 1st Earl of Harborough||1719||1732||
|-
|Philip Sherard, 2nd Earl of Harborough||1732||1750||
|-
|rowspan=2|Earl of Macclesfield (1721)||Thomas Parker, 1st Earl of Macclesfield||1721||1732||Died
|-
|George Parker, 2nd Earl of Macclesfield||1732||1764||
|-
|Earl of Pomfret (1721)||Thomas Fermor, 1st Earl of Pomfret||1721||1753||
|-
|Countess of Walsingham (1722)||Melusina von der Schulenburg, Countess of Walsingham||1722||1778||
|-
|Earl Graham of Belford (1722)||William Graham, 1st Earl Graham||1722||1790||
|-
|Earl Ker (1722)||Robert Ker, 1st Earl Ker||1722||1790||
|-
|Earl Waldegrave (1729)||James Waldegrave, 1st Earl Waldegrave||1729||1741||
|-
|rowspan=2|Earl of Ashburnham (1730)||John Ashburnham, 1st Earl of Ashburnham||1730||1737||New creation; died
|-
|John Ashburnham, 2nd Earl of Ashburnham||1737||1812||
|-
|Earl of Wilmington (1730)||Spencer Compton, 1st Earl of Wilmington||1730||1743||New creation
|-
|Earl FitzWalter (1730)||Benjamin Mildmay, 1st Earl FitzWalter||1730||1756||New creation
|-
|Earl of Effingham (1731)||Francis Howard, 1st Earl of Effingham||1731||1743||New creation
|-
|Earl of Malton (1734)||Thomas Watson-Wentworth, 1st Earl of Malton||1734||1750||New creation
|-
|}

Viscounts

|colspan=5 style="background: #fcc" align="center"|Peerage of England
|-
|Viscount Hereford (1550)||Price Devereux, 9th Viscount Hereford||1700||1740||
|-
|Viscount Montagu (1554)||Anthony Browne, 6th Viscount Montagu||1717||1767||
|-
|Viscount Saye and Sele (1624)||Laurence Fiennes, 5th Viscount Saye and Sele||1710||1742||
|-
|Viscount Fauconberg (1643)||Thomas Belasyse, 4th Viscount Fauconberg||1718||1774||
|-
|Viscount Hatton (1682)||William Seton Hatton, 2nd Viscount Hatton||1706||1760||
|-
|rowspan="2"|Viscount Townshend (1682)||Charles Townshend, 2nd Viscount Townshend||1687||1738||Died
|-
|Charles Townshend, 3rd Viscount Townshend||1738||1764||
|-
|Viscount Weymouth (1682)||Thomas Thynne, 2nd Viscount Weymouth||1714||1751||
|-
|Viscount Lonsdale (1690)||Henry Lowther, 3rd Viscount Lonsdale||1713||1751||
|-
|colspan=5 style="background: #fcc" align="center"|Peerage of Scotland
|-
|rowspan=2|Viscount of Falkland (1620)||Lucius Cary, 6th Viscount of Falkland||1694||1730||Died
|-
|Lucius Cary, 7th Viscount Falkland||1730||1785||
|-
|rowspan=2|Viscount of Stormont (1621)||David Murray, 5th Viscount of Stormont||1668||1731||Died
|-
|David Murray, 6th Viscount of Stormont||1731||1748||
|-
|Viscount of Arbuthnott (1641)||John Arbuthnot, 5th Viscount of Arbuthnott||1710||1756||
|-
|rowspan=2|Viscount of Irvine (1661)||Arthur Ingram, 6th Viscount of Irvine||1721||1736||Died
|-
|Henry Ingram, 7th Viscount of Irvine||1736||1761||
|-
|Viscount Preston (1681)||Charles Graham, 3rd Viscount Preston||1710||1739||Died; Peerage extinct
|-
|Viscount of Strathallan (1686)||William Drummond, 4th Viscount Strathallan||1711||1746||
|-
|rowspan=3|Viscount of Garnock (1703)||Patrick Lindsay-Crawford, 2nd Viscount of Garnock||1708||1735||Died
|-
|John Lindsay-Crawford, 3rd Viscount of Garnock||1735||1738||
|-
|George Lindsay-Crawford, 4th Viscount of Garnock||1738||1808||
|-
|Viscount of Primrose (1703)||Hugh Primrose, 3rd Viscount of Primrose||1716||1741||
|-
|colspan=5 style="background: #fcc" align="center"|Peerage of Great Britain
|-
|Viscount Bolingbroke (1712)||Henry St John, 1st Viscount Bolingbroke||1712||1751||
|-
|Viscount Tadcaster (1714)||Henry O'Brien, 1st Viscount Tadcaster||1714||1741||
|-
|Viscount St John (1716)||Henry St John, 1st Viscount St John||1716||1742||
|-
|Viscount Cobham (1718)||Richard Temple, 1st Viscount Cobham||1718||1749||
|-
|rowspan=2|Viscount Falmouth (1720)||Hugh Boscawen, 1st Viscount Falmouth||1720||1734||Died
|-
|Hugh Boscawen, 2nd Viscount Falmouth||1734||1782||
|-
|Viscount Lymington (1720)||John Wallop, 1st Viscount Lymington||1720||1762||
|-
|rowspan=2|Viscount Torrington (1721)||George Byng, 1st Viscount Torrington||1721||1733||Died
|-
|Pattee Byng, 2nd Viscount Torrington||1733||1747||
|-
|Viscount Harcourt (1721)||Simon Harcourt, 2nd Viscount Harcourt||1727||1777||
|-
|}

Barons

|colspan=5 style="background: #fcc" align="center"|Peerage of England
|-
|Baron FitzWalter (1295)||Benjamin Mildmay, 19th Baron FitzWalter||1728||1756||Created Earl FitzWalter, see above
|- 
|Baron Clinton (1299)||Hugh Fortescue, 14th Baron Clinton||1721||1751||
|- 
|Baron Ferrers of Chartley (1299)||Elizabeth Compton, 15th Baroness Ferrers of Chartley||1717||1741||
|- 
|Baron de Clifford (1299)||Margaret Coke, 19th Baroness de Clifford||1734||1775||Abeyance terminated
|- 
|rowspan="2"|Baron Dudley (1440)||Edward Ward, 9th Baron Dudley||1704||1731||Died
|- 
|William Ward, 10th Baron Dudley||1731||1740||
|- 
|Baron Stourton (1448)||Thomas Stourton, 14th Baron Stourton||1720||1744||
|- 
|Baron Berners (1455)||Katherine Bokenham, 8th Baroness Berners||1711||1743||
|- 
|Baron Willoughby de Broke (1491)||Richard Verney, 13th Baron Willoughby de Broke||1728||1752||
|- 
|Baron Wentworth (1529)||Martha Johnson, 8th Baroness Wentworth||1697||1745||
|-
|Baron Wharton (1544)||Jane Wharton, 7th Baroness Wharton||1739||1761||Abeyance terminated
|-
|Baron Willoughby of Parham (1547)||Hugh Willoughby, 15th Baron Willoughby of Parham||1715||1765||
|-
|rowspan="2"|Baron North (1554)||William North, 6th Baron North||1691||1734||Died
|-
|Francis North, 7th Baron North||1734||1790||
|-
|Baron Howard of Effingham (1554)||Francis Howard, 7th Baron Howard of Effingham||1725||1743||Created Earl of Effingham, see above
|-
|Baron Hunsdon (1559)||William Ferdinand Carey, 8th Baron Hunsdon||1702||1765||
|-
|Baron St John of Bletso (1559)||John St John, 11th Baron St John of Bletso||1722||1757||
|-
|Baron De La Warr (1570)||John West, 7th Baron De La Warr||1723||1766||
|-
|Baron Gerard (1603)||Philip Gerard, 7th Baron Gerard||1707||1733||Died, title extinct
|-
|Baron Petre (1603)||Robert Petre, 8th Baron Petre||1713||1742||
|-
|Baron Arundell of Wardour (1605)||Henry Arundell, 6th Baron Arundell of Wardour||1726||1746||
|-
|Baron Dormer (1615)||Charles Dormer, 6th Baron Dormer||1728||1761||
|-
|Baron Teynham (1616)||Henry Roper, 10th Baron Teynham||1727||1781||
|-
|Baron Brooke (1621)||Francis Greville, 8th Baron Brooke||1727||1773||
|-
|rowspan="2"|Baron Craven (1627)||William Craven, 3rd Baron Craven||1711||1739||Died
|-
|Fulwar Craven, 4th Baron Craven||1739||1764||
|-
|Baron Lovelace (1627)||Nevill Lovelace, 6th Baron Lovelace ||1709||1736||Died, title extinct
|-
|Baron Strange (1628)||Henrietta Ashburnham, 5th Baroness Strange||1718||1732||Died, Barony succeeded by the Earl of Derby
|-
|Baron Maynard (1628)||Henry Maynard, 4th Baron Maynard||1718||1742||
|-
|rowspan="2"|Baron Leigh (1643)||Edward Leigh, 3rd Baron Leigh||1710||1738||Died
|-
|Thomas Leigh, 4th Baron Leigh||1738||1749||
|-
|rowspan="2"|Baron Byron (1643)||William Byron, 4th Baron Byron||1695||1736||Died
|-
|William Byron, 5th Baron Byron||1736||1798||
|-
|Baron Langdale (1658)||Marmaduke Langdale, 4th Baron Langdale||1718||1771||
|-
|Baron Berkeley of Stratton (1658)||William Berkeley, 4th Baron Berkeley of Stratton||1697||1741||
|-
|Baron Cornwallis (1661)||Charles Cornwallis, 5th Baron Cornwallis||1722||1762||
|-
|Baron Arundell of Trerice (1664)||John Arundell, 4th Baron Arundell of Trerice||1706||1768||
|-
|rowspan="3"|Baron Clifford of Chudleigh (1672)||Hugh Clifford, 2nd Baron Clifford of Chudleigh||1673||1730||Died
|-
|Hugh Clifford, 3rd Baron Clifford of Chudleigh||1730||1732||Died
|-
|Hugh Clifford, 4th Baron Clifford of Chudleigh||1732||1783||
|-
|Baron Willoughby of Parham (1680)||Hugh Willoughby, 15th Baron Willoughby of Parham||1715||1765||
|-
|Baron Carteret (1681)||John Carteret, 2nd Baron Carteret||1695||1763||
|-
|Baron Stawell (1683)||William Stawell, 3rd Baron Stawell||1692||1742||
|-
|Baron Guilford (1683)||Francis North, 3rd Baron Guilford||1729||1790||
|-
|Baron Griffin (1688)||Edward Griffin, 3rd Baron Griffin||1715||1742||
|-
|Baron Ashburnham (1689)||John Ashburnham, 3rd Baron Ashburnham||1710||1730||Created Earl of Ashburnham, see above
|-
|Baron Herbert of Chirbury (1694)||Henry Herbert, 2nd Baron Herbert of Chirbury||1709||1738||Died, title extinct
|-
|Baron Haversham (1696)||Maurice Thompson, 2nd Baron Haversham||1710||1745||
|-
|Baron Barnard (1698)||Gilbert Vane, 2nd Baron Barnard||1723||1753||
|-
|Baron Gower (1703)||John Leveson-Gower, 2nd Baron Gower||1709||1754||
|-
|rowspan="2"|Baron Conway (1703)||Francis Seymour-Conway, 1st Baron Conway||1703||1732||Died
|-
|Francis Seymour-Conway, 2nd Baron Conway||1732||1794||
|-
|colspan=5 style="background: #fcc" align="center"|Peerage of Scotland
|-
|Lord Somerville (1430)||James Somerville, 13th Lord Somerville||1709||1765||
|-
|rowspan=3|Lord Forbes (1442)||William Forbes, 13th Lord Forbes||1716||1730||Died
|-
|Francis Forbes, 14th Lord Forbes||1730||1734||Died
|-
|James Forbes, 15th Lord Forbes||1734||1761||
|-
|Lord Saltoun (1445)||Alexander Fraser, 13th Lord Saltoun||1715||1748||
|-
|rowspan=2|Lord Gray (1445)||John Gray, 10th Lord Gray||1724||1738||Died
|-
|John Gray, 11th Lord Gray||1738||1782||
|-
|Lord Oliphant (1455)||Francis Oliphant, 10th Lord Oliphant||1721||1748||
|-
|rowspan=2|Lord Cathcart (1460)||Alan Cathcart, 7th Lord Cathcart||1709||1732||Died
|-
|Charles Cathcart, 8th Lord Cathcart||1732||1740||
|-
|Lord Lovat (1464)||Simon Fraser, 11th Lord Lovat||1699||1746||
|-
|Lord Sempill (1489)||Hugh Sempill, 12th Lord Sempill||1727||1746||
|-
|rowspan=2|Lord Ross (1499)||William Ross, 12th Lord Ross||1682||1738||Died
|-
|George Ross, 13th Lord Ross||1738||1754||
|-
|Lord Elphinstone (1509)||Charles Elphinstone, 9th Lord Elphinstone||1718||1757||
|-
|Lord Torphichen (1564)||James Sandilands, 7th Lord Torphichen||1696||1753||
|-
|Lord Lindores (1600)||Alexander Leslie, 6th Lord Lindores||1719||1765||
|-
|Lord Colville of Culross (1604)||John Colville, 6th Lord Colville of Culross||1717||1741||
|-
|rowspan=2|Lord Balmerinoch (1606)||John Elphinstone, 4th Lord Balmerino||1704||1736||Died
|-
|John Elphinstone, 5th Lord Balmerino||1736||1746||
|-
|Lord Blantyre (1606)||Robert Stuart, 7th Lord Blantyre||1713||1743||
|-
|Lord Cranstoun (1609)||James Cranstoun, 6th Lord Cranstoun||1727||1773||
|-
|Lord Aston of Forfar (1627)||Walter Aston, 4th Lord Aston of Forfar||1714||1748||
|-
|Lord Fairfax of Cameron (1627)||Thomas Fairfax, 6th Lord Fairfax of Cameron||1710||1781||
|-
|Lord Napier (1627)||Francis Napier, 6th Lord Napier||1706||1773||
|-
|Lord Reay (1628)||George Mackay, 3rd Lord Reay||1681||1748||
|-
|Lord Cramond (1628)||William Richardson, 5th Lord Cramond||1719||1735||Died; Peerage extinct
|-
|Lord Forbes of Pitsligo (1633)||Alexander Forbes, 4th Lord Forbes of Pitsligo||1690||1746||
|-
|rowspan=2|Lord Kirkcudbright (1633)||James Maclellan, 6th Lord Kirkcudbright||1678||1730||Died
|-
|William Maclellan, 7th Lord Kirkcudbright||1730||1762||
|-
|Lord Forrester (1633)||George Forrester, 6th Lord Forrester||1727||1748||
|-
|Lord Bargany (1641)||James Hamilton, 4th Lord Bargany||1712||1736||Died; Peerage dormant or extinct
|-
|rowspan=2|Lord Banff (1642)||John George Ogilvy, 5th Lord Banff||1718||1738||Died
|-
|Alexander Ogilvy, 6th Lord Banff||1738||1746||
|-
|rowspan=2|Lord Elibank (1643)||Alexander Murray, 4th Lord Elibank||1687||1736||Died
|-
|Patrick Murray, 5th Lord Elibank||1736||1778||
|-
|Lord Falconer of Halkerton (1646)||David Falconer, 4th Lord Falconer of Halkerton||1724||1751||
|-
|Lord Belhaven and Stenton (1647)||John Hamilton, 4th Lord Belhaven and Stenton||1721||1764||
|-
|Lord Duffus (1650)||Kenneth Sutherland, 3rd Lord Duffus||1705||1734||Attainted 
|-
|Lord Rollo (1651)||Robert Rollo, 4th Lord Rollo||1700||1758||
|-
|Lord Ruthven of Freeland (1650)||Isobel Ruthven, 4th Lady Ruthven of Freeland||1722||1783||
|-
|Lord Bellenden (1661)||John Bellenden, 3rd Lord Bellenden||1707||1741||
|-
|Lord Kinnaird (1682)||Charles Kinnaird, 5th Lord Kinnaird||1727||1758||
|-
|}

References

 

1730
1730s in England
1730s in Ireland
1730s in Scotland
Peers
Peers
Peers
Peers
Peers
Peers
18th-century nobility